The Petit Basset Griffon Vendéen, or PBGV, is a breed of dog of the scent hound type, bred to trail hares in bramble-filled terrain of the Vendée district of France. The breed is known in the United States as "Petit" or "PBGV," in England as "Roughie," and in Denmark as "Griffon" or "Petit". The PBGV is one of six types of "basset"-type breeds recognised by the Fédération Cynologique Internationale (FCI).

Description

Appearance
Both males and females should be of similar size, range between 12.5 and 15.5 inches (32 to 40 cm) at the withers and between 25 and 40 pounds (15 to 20 kilograms).

Like the other 3 Griffon Vendéen breeds: the Grand Griffon Vendéen, Briquet Griffon Vendéen, and the Grand Basset Griffon Vendéen; they are solid dogs that appear rough and unrefined yet casual. They have short legs, a sturdy bone structure, and a body that is only slightly longer than it is tall at the withers. The body length is not as extreme as that of a basset hound or dachshund.

The dogs have a tousled appearance, with a harsh double coat that is both long and rough. The hair on the face and legs may be softer than body hair. The fur on the face resembles a beard and moustache. They usually have very long eyelashes.

The skull is domed, with drop, oval ears like many hounds share, though dogs tend to have higher domes than bitches. The ears are set low and hanging, and if stretched out should reach the tip of the nose. The tail is usually held upright, and is long and tapered to the end, similar in shape to a saber.

The coloring is primarily white with spots of orange or lemon or black or grizzle (gray-and-white hairs) or sable, sometimes with tan accents. They may be bicolor, tricolor, or have grizzling.

Temperament and breeding
PBGVs are extroverted, friendly, and independent hounds. Sometimes called the "happy breed", PBGVs have tirelessly wagging tails and expressive, intelligent eyes. PBGVs are typically active and lively.  This breed most often interacts well with both other dogs and people.   The PBGV standard states that the dog should "give voice freely"—as is typical of hounds, petits are outspoken dogs. If their 'pack' begins howling or singing, the dog will join in, with amusing results. PBGVs may howl alone or with a companion; they may howl to music, for fun, or in protest at being left alone. PBGV companions report that sleeping dogs have been known to awaken and howl along with favorite songs.

The PBGV is not a quiet dog. While no PBGV would ever be called "yippy," their assertive, hound-bray is uncharacteristically loud for their petite stature. The outspoken nature of a PBGV varies from dog to dog, but even the shyest Petit will greet other dogs with a bark or call.

Like other hounds, Petits can be a little stubborn when it comes to training.  Yet it is not unusual to see PBGV's excel in agility, obedience and in the ring - all requiring training.

Because they are so extroverted, friendly, and happy, PBGVs make superb therapy dogs.

PBGVs are excellent hunting and tracking dogs.  Many PBGVs have passed  a "Hunting Instinct Test"  and earned AKC hunting titles.   Petits who work in this manner do not hunt to kill. In the Vendee region of France, the dogs are used to flush and track rabbit in the bramble, sending rabbit out into the open where the hunter takes the rabbit with a shot. Skilled hunting dogs work well with other dogs in the pack, alerting the pack to the presence of a rabbit, or to a rabbit in motion down a trail. "Saber tails," another PBGV nickname, are typically white at the tip of the tail, so the tail is easily identified by a hunter above the bramble and brush.

As a companion animal, this occasionally pronounced hunting instinct may manifest in the home as a dog that gives chase to birds, squirrel, and cats. For some PBGVs, this instinct may be difficult to overcome with training. Most PBGVs make fine companion animals, and have suitable manners to live among cats and other animals without assuming a hunting role.  Potential PBGV owners are cautioned to be aware of this instinct and, if cats are present in the home, work to acclimate the puppy or dog to recognize that the cat is part of the home "pack."

As scent hounds, most PBGVs should be kept on-leash when in open, non-fenced outdoor areas. Even the most obedient dog may give chase when a scent is found. Petits are natural athletes, and they can run fast and long where scent is involved. Scent will typically trump obedience in the mind of a PBGV.  In fact, PBGVs excel at nose work and many have earned AKC scent work and tracking titles.

The outspoken nature and erect tail of a PBGV can be misinterpreted by other dogs, as these manners typically express dominance to other dogs. PBGVs can inspire a misguided need to express dominance on the part of passing dogs. PBGV owners need to be alert to this potential misinterpretation, as Petits are easily outclassed in both size and aggressiveness.

Health

The UK Kennel Club conducted a health survey of Basset Griffon Vendéens (both Petit and Grand varieties combined) in 2004. The Petit Basset Griffon Vendéen (PBGV) Club of America has conducted two health surveys, one in 1994 and one in 2000.

Mortality
Average longevity of PBGVs in the 2000 Club of America survey was 12.7 years (standard deviation 3.9). Sample size was not clear, but it appeared to be 45 dogs. No longevity data were collected in the 1994 survey. There was no information on causes of death.

Average longevity of 76 deceased Basset Griffon Vendéens (both varieties) in the 2004 UK Kennel Club survey was 12.1 years (maximum 17.3 years). Leading causes of death were cancer (33%), old age (24%), and cardiac (7%).

Compared to surveyed longevities of other breeds of similar size, Basset Griffon Vendéens have a typical or somewhat higher than average life expectancy. It is not uncommon for the breed to live to be 14 or 15 years of age.

Morbidity
In the PBGV Club of America 2000 survey, the most common diseases reported by owners of 640 dogs were persistent pupillary membranes, recurrent ear infections, hypothyroidism, neck pain, and epilepsy, treated with daily medication, principally phenobarbitol. In later years they can develop an eye condition known to mainly effect German Shepherds, called Panis. This is kept at bay using steroidal eye drops.

Among 289 live Basset Griffon Vendéens (both varieties) in the 2004 UKC survey, the most common health issues noted by owners were reproductive, dermatologic (dermatitis and mites), and aural (otitis externa, excessive ear wax, and ear mites). They are also prone to dislocation of their hips due to their long bodies, short legs, and the fact they carry a robust amount of weight for their size. On average around 15 kg.

Care
Part of the charm of a PBGV is its tousled, unkempt appearance.

They should have daily walks or much play time in a large, fenced yard to burn off excess energy. They need to be brushed regularly, but not daily, to avoid matting and tangles.

To keep the coat well groomed it should be occasionally stripped. Hairs must be pulled out of the coat using either a special stripping tool or the finger and thumb. The coat is shallow rooted and is made to come out if trapped, so this grooming method causes no pain.

They need regular ear cleanings to prevent yeast infections and clipping of the claws is normally needed once or twice a month.

Crufts 2013

Winner of the world's biggest dog show, Crufts, in 2013, the four-year-old Soletrader Peek A Boo ("Jilly") beat more than twenty thousand dogs to take the coveted title. She won the Hound Group on the first day of the show and then proceeded to win Best of Show on the fourth day. Jilly was previously Reserve Best of Show at Crufts in 2011.

See also
 Dogs portal
 List of dog breeds
Basset Hound
Basset Bleu de Gascogne
Basset Fauve de Bretagne
Basset Artésien Normand
Grand Basset Griffon Vendéen
Coat (dog)

References

External links

 Petit Basset Griffon Vendéen Club of America
 Basset Griffon Vendéen Club of Great Britain - Breed club for the Petit and Grand Basset Griffon Vendeens

FCI breeds
Rare dog breeds
Companion dogs
Scent hounds
Dog breeds originating in France